Andre Agassi was the defending champion but lost in the third round to Patrick Rafter.

Michael Chang won in the final 6–2, 6–4 against Wayne Ferreira.

Seeds
The top eight seeds received a bye to the second round.

Draw

Finals

Top half

Section 1

Section 2

Bottom half

Section 3

Section 4

External links
 1996 Legg Mason Tennis Classic draw

1996 ATP Tour